Baron de Longueuil is a title of French nobility that was granted originally by King Louis XIV of France to a Norman military officer, Charles le Moyne de Longueuil. Its continuing recognition since the cession of Canada by France to Britain is based on the Treaty of Paris (1763), which reserved to those of French descent all rights which they had enjoyed before the cession.

The title descends to the heirs general of the first grantee, and as such survives today in the person of Michael Grant, the 12th Baron de Longueuil, a cognatic descendant of the 1st Baron.

History
The Seigniory of Longueuil was first granted in 1657 to Charles le Moyne de Longueuil et de Châteauguay, Sieur de Longueuil, and it was raised to the label of Barony of Longueuil in 1700 by King Louis XIV in recognition of Le Moyne's services. Le Moyne had named the land that was granted to him in 1657 after the French hometown of his mother, Longueil in Normandy.

By 1710, the barony had expanded to include land from the Saint Lawrence River to the Richelieu River, and south along the west bank of the river to the Seigniory of DeLéry.

Charles Le Moyne died in Montreal in 1729, and the barony passed to his son, also named Charles Le Moyne (1687–1755), the second baron. His son and the third baron, Charles-Jacques Le Moyne (1724-1756), was reported missing in action in the aftermath of the Battle of Lake George, during the Seven Years' War. His wife Marie-Anne-Catherine Fleury Deschambault refused to acknowledge his death until 1759, and shortly after the battle gave birth to twin girls. She married William Grant in 1770, the son of the Laird of Blairfindy, Moray, Scotland. The barony was to be inherited by her surviving daughter, Marie-Charles-Joseph Le Mote de Longueuil, and Grant arranged a marriage to his nephew, Captain David Alexander Grant of the British 84th Regiment. The couple were wed in 1781, and their eldest son became the fifth Baron de Longueuil in 1841.

When the seigneurial system was abolished in 1854, what had not been sold was entailed. Although dissolved, the Barony of Longueuil continued to receive seigneurial revenues until 1969.

After the conquest of New France, the descendants of Charles le Moyne maintained that, since Britain had promised to respect the ancient land tenures, it was obliged to recognize Longueuil as a barony. It was not until 1880, however, that a formal request for recognition was made to Queen Victoria.

The matter was submitted to the law officers of the crown, who ruled the claim to be well grounded and the rank and title of Charles Colmore Grant, seventh Baron de Longueuil, were formally recognized by royal proclamation, the royal recognition being officially announced as follows:

The Queen has been graciously pleased to recognize the right of Charles Colmore Grant, Esquire, to the title of Baron de Longueuil, of Longueuil, in the province of Quebec, Canada. This title was conferred on his ancestor, Charles Le Moyne, by letters-patent of nobility signed by King Louis XIV in the year 1700.

On 10 May 2004, the city of Longueuil in the province of Quebec was granted arms by the Canadian Heraldic Authority based on the arms granted by King Louis XIV in 1668 to the original Charles le Moyne, sieur de Longueuil, in the presence of the Lieutenant-Governor of Quebec and Raymond Grant, 11th Baron de Longueuil. In 2007, an uninhabited island of the Saint Lawrence River formerly known as île Verte (between Montreal and Longueuil) was renamed to Îlot de la Baronnie in honour of them.

Letters patent
The original letters patent issued by Louis XIV are titled as follows:

"Erection en baronnie de la seigneurie de Longueuil en faveur de Charles Lemoyne de Longueuil" donné à Versailles, le vingt-sixième du mois de janvier, l'an de grâce mil sept cent, et de notre règne, la cinquante-septième – signé Louis
("Elevation to the rank of barony of the seigniory of Longueuil in favour of Charles Lemoyne of Longueuil" given at Versailles, the 26 January, in the year of our Lord seventeen hundred, and the fifty-seventh year of our reign – signed Louis)

An extract, providing for the devolution of the title, reads as follows:

''"A ces causes, de notre grâce spéciale, pleine puissance et autorité royalle, nous avons créé, érigé, élevé et décoré, créons, érigeons et décorons par ces présentes signées de notre main, la dite terre et seigneurie de Longueuil, scituée en notre pays de Canada, en titre, nom et dignité de baronnie pour en jouir par le dit Sieur Charles Le Moyne, ses enfants, successeurs, ayant cause, et les descendants d'iceux en légitime mariage, plainement et paisiblement, relevant de nous à cause de nostre couronne..."
("For these reasons, we, of our peculiar grace, absolute power and royal authority, have created, established, exalted and decorated, and do by these presents signed with our hand create, establish and decorate, the said land and seigniory of Longueuil, situate in our country of Canada, with the title, name and dignity of a barony for the enjoyment of the said Sieur Charles Le Moyne, his children and successors according to law, and the descendants of the same born in lawful wedlock, in full and peaceable subjection to us by right of our crown..."

List of Barons de Longueuil
1700–1729 Charles II le Moyne, 1st Baron de Longueuil
1729–1755 Charles III le Moyne, 2nd Baron de Longueuil
1755-1755 Charles-Jacques le Moyne, 3rd Baron de Longueuil
1755–1841 Marie-Charles le Moyne, 4th Baroness de Longueuil
1841–1848 Charles William Grant, 5th Baron de Longueuil
1848–1879 Charles James Irwin Grant, 6th Baron de Longueuil
1879–1898 Charles Colmore Grant, 7th Baron de Longueuil
1898–1931 Reginald Charles Grant, 8th Baron de Longueuil
1931–1938 John Charles Moore Grant, 9th Baron de Longueuil
1938–1959 Ronald Charles Grant, 10th Baron de Longueuil
1959–2004 Raymond Grant, 11th Baron de Longueuil
2004–present Michael Grant, 12th Baron de Longueuil

See also
 Canadian Hereditary Peers
 Canadian titles debate

Notes

External links
Portrait of Charles le Moyne du Longueuil, 3rd Baron du Longueuil, 1724–1755 at the McCord Museum
Société d'histoire de Longueuil – Ressources et documentation
Michel Pratt Édition révisée et augmentée, 30 mai 2005, Dictionnaire historique de Longueuil, de Jacques-Cartier et de Montréal-Sud. at: https://web.archive.org/web/20100407054725/http://marigot.ca/dictio/longueuil/g.html

 
Le Moyne family